Daphne du Maurier's novel Mary Anne (1954) is a fictionalised account of the real-life story of her great-great-grandmother, Mary Anne Clarke, née Thompson (1776-1852). It was published by Gollancz in the UK and by Doubleday in the US.

Mary Anne Clarke from 1803 to 1808 was mistress of Frederick Augustus, the Duke of York and Albany (1763-1827).

He was "The Grand Old Duke of York" of the nursery rhyme, a son of King George III and brother of the later King George IV.

References

1954 British novels
Novels by Daphne du Maurier
Biographical novels
English historical novels
Victor Gollancz Ltd books